Anchylobela dyseimata is a species of snout moth in the genus Anchylobela. It was described by Alfred Jefferis Turner in 1913, and is known from Australia.

References

Moths described in 1913
Anerastiini
Moths of Australia